Thomas-Alfred Bernier (August 15, 1844 – December 30, 1908) was a Canadian journalist, lawyer, and senator.

Born in Saint-Georges-d'Henryville, County of Iberville, Quebec, the son of Thomas Bernier and Julia Létourneau, Bernier was educated at the College of St. Hyacinthe. He was married in August 1871 to Julia Malvina and they had ten children, three of whom died in infancy.

He worked in journalism and was a lawyer who practiced for some years in St. John d'Iberville, and in 1880, he moved to Manitoba. He was Superintendent of Education for the Catholic schools in Manitoba from 1881 to 1890 until public funding for the Catholic schools was abolished. From 1881 to 1893, he was Registrar of the University of Manitoba. He was a member of the Executive Committee of the Provincial Agricultural Board, and Chairman of the Eastern Judicial District Board. Bernier was Mayor of St. Boniface in 1883, 1884, 1886, 1891, and 1897. He was also a Commissioner to revise the municipal law, and a Commissioner to inquire into the working of the law in connection with the sale of Métis lands.

In 1892, he was appointed to the Senate on the advice of John Joseph Caldwell Abbott representing the senatorial division of St-Boniface, Manitoba. A Conservative, he died in office in 1908 after serving for 16 years.

References

External links
 
 
 Manitoba Historical Society: Thomas-Alfred Bernier

1844 births
1908 deaths
Canadian senators from Manitoba
Conservative Party of Canada (1867–1942) senators
Mayors of Saint Boniface, Winnipeg